XIII. Století ('13th Century') is a Czech band from Jihlava playing gothic rock and hard rock. Initially, the band's style was post-punk, and the band's name was HNF - Hrdinové Nové Fronty ("Heroes of The New Front").

The band is mostly popular in Poland.

Discography 
 Amulet (1992)
 Gotika (1994)
 Nosferatu (1995)
 Werewolf (1996)
 Ztraceni v Karpatech (1998)
 Metropolis (2000)
 Karneval (2001)
 Vendetta (2004)
 Vampire Songs — Tajemství gotických archivů (2005)
 Dogma (2009)
 Nocturno (2010)
 Ritual (Compilation, 2011)
 Live in Berlin (2012)
 Horizont události (2013)
 Intacto (2016)
 Frankenstein (2019)
 Zahrada světel (2020)

Czech gothic rock groups
Czech rock music groups
1989 establishments in Czechoslovakia
Musical groups established in 1989